Sunker Nunataks is a group of small, rounded nunataks rising through the ice on the east side of Northwind Glacier, similar in appearance to a reef at sea, in the Convoy Range, Victoria Land. So named by a 1989-90 New Zealand Antarctic Research Program (NZARP) field party. In Newfoundland fisherman's parlance, a sunker is a rocky reef.

Nunataks of Victoria Land
Scott Coast